The Continental O-240 engine is a four-cylinder, horizontally opposed, air-cooled aircraft engine that was developed in the late 1960s for use in light aircraft by Continental Motors, Inc.  The first O-240 was certified on 7 July 1971.

Design and development 
The  O-240 was a new engine design derived from the six-cylinder Continental O-360 and introduced in 1971. It is generally similar in overall dimensions to the Continental O-200, but with a higher 8.5:1 compression ratio, designed to run on 100/130 avgas. The O-240 delivers 30% more power than the O-200 while it weighs only 12% more. It may be mounted in tractor or pusher configuration.

The O-240 was produced under license in the United Kingdom by Rolls-Royce Limited and was used to power the Reims-Cessna FRA150 Aerobat, a more powerful aerobatic model of the Cessna 150 constructed in France by Reims Aviation under license. Rolls-Royce acquired the rights to the O-240, but not the IO-240 in 1977.

The fuel-injected IO-240-A and -B were introduced in 1993. The A and B versions differ only in the type of fuel injector used.

The IOF-240 is similar to the IO-240-B except that it employs an Aerosance FADEC system to control the ignition and fuel injection systems. The engine was not selected to power any production North American-manufactured aircraft until the Liberty XL2 entered production in 2006 powered by the IOF-240-B.

Variants

O-240-A
Dual ignition,  at 2800 rpm, dry weight  including starter and generator. Uses a Marvel-Schebler MA-3SPA IO 5067 carburetor. Certified 7 July 1971
IO-240-A
Dual ignition,  at 2800 rpm, dry weight , uses a TCM 639231A27 fuel injector
IO-240-B
Dual ignition,  at 2800 rpm, dry weight , uses a TCM 639231A34 fuel injector
IOF-240-B
Aerosance FADEC system controls the ignition and fuel injection systems,  at 2800 rpm, dry weight

Applications

O-240
AESL Airtourer T3
Reims Cessna FRA150 Aerobat ("R" meaning a Rolls-Royce-built O-240)
Rutan Voyager (front engine)
Practavia Sprite
Rollason Condor (D62C)
St Croix Pietenpol Aerial
Tri-R KIS TR-1
Warner Revolution II
IO-240
American Homebuilts John Doe
Diamond DA20-C1
Eagle Aircraft 150B
Rans S-16 Shekari
Roko Aero NG4
IOF-240-B
Issoire APM 40 Simba
Liberty XL2

Specifications (IOF-240-B)

See also
 Lycoming IO-233
List of aircraft engines

References

Notes

Bibliography

Gunston, Bill. World Encyclopedia of Aero Engines. Cambridge, England. Patrick Stephens Limited, 1989. 

1970s aircraft piston engines
Boxer engines
O-240